Kim Jong-sik is a North Korean politician and general who is serving is deputy director of the Munitions Industry Department of the WPK Central Committee.

Biography
Little is known about him. He has background the space and missle industry, being a rocket scientist who previously working in the Second Academy of Natural Sciences and the North Korean space agency. He was involved in the development of Unha-3 rocket and Sohae Satellite Launching Station. In November 2022 he was appointed 4-star general.

References

Workers' Party of Korea politicians
North Korean generals
Year of birth missing (living people)
Place of birth missing (living people)